Sinaia is a town and a mountain resort in Prahova County, Romania. It is situated in the historical region of Muntenia. The town was named after the Sinaia Monastery of 1695, around which it was built. The monastery, in turn, is named after the Biblical Mount Sinai. King Carol I of Romania also built his summer residence, Peleș Castle, in Sinaia in the late nineteenth century.

The city is a popular destination for hiking and winter sports, especially downhill skiing. Among the tourist landmarks, the most important are Peleș Castle, Pelișor Castle, Sinaia Monastery, Sinaia Casino, Sinaia train station, and the Franz Joseph and Saint Anne Cliffs. Sinaia was also the summer residence of the Romanian composer George Enescu, who stayed at the Luminiș villa.

Climate

Sinaia has a warm-summer humid continental climate (Dfb in the Köppen climate classification).

Summers are bracing and very rainy at the beginning of the season. Winters are moderately cold, with heavy snow.

A uniform layer of snow is deposited usually in November and it melts from March to April, sometimes at the beginning of May.

In recent years, Sinaia has felt the effects of global climate change.

Nature preservation
In the town of Sinaia and its surroundings restrictions are in place regarding cutting down or picking flora. The felling of trees is not allowed. It is forbidden to pick any alpine plants. Severe punishments are enforced for anyone who gathers : the Mountain Peony (Rhododendron Kotsky), Edelweiss (Leontopodium alpinum), and the Yellow Gentiana (Gentiana lutea). Tourist camping is only authorized in designated places, following necessary and compulsory protection standards.

The mountainous area in which Sinaia is located is in the Bucegi Natural Park region. The Bucegi Natural Preserve area includes all the most precipitous areas of the mountains Vârful cu Dor, Furnica, and Piatra Arsă. The mountainous area is continuously patrolled by mountain rescue patrols as well as by members of the Mountain Police.

At the entrance to the Cumpătu district, one can find the “Sinaia alder-tree grove” botanical reservation placed under the protection of the Romanian Academy and the Bucharest Biology Institute. In the same district, there is also another ecological research station under the patronage of UNESCO – Jacques-Yves Cousteau, belonging to the University of Bucharest, which also includes a museum of Bucegi Mountains fauna.

Tourist attractions
Peleș Castle
Pelișor Castle
Sinaia Monastery
Sinaia Casino International Conference Center
Carmen Sylva Cultural Center
George Enescu Memorial House
Dimitrie Ghica park and the Bucegi Reserve Museum
Heroes Cemetery 
Franz Joseph and Saint Anne Cliffs
Old electrical power plant
Sinaia railway station
Many other old villas
Bucegi Mountains with a cable car connecting the resort with Cota 1400 and Cota 2000 
Baiu Mountains
16 ski slopes
4 mountain-bike trails

Sinaia Forever Festival 
Sinaia Forever, or the Autumn Festival, is one of the main festivals that takes place in Sinaia. The goal of the festival is to recreate the atmosphere of the 1940s while bringing in modern performers. The festival once took place during the last weekend of September, but was just recently changed to the first weekend of the month. During the festival, the downtown area of Sinaia is closed off to motorized vehicles. It becomes full of people, food stands, and children's rides. The three-day festival consists of the opening parade, concerts from well known musical artists of Romania, and amusement rides.

International relations

Sinaia is twinned with:
 Aosta, Italy
 Cetinje, Montenegro
 Hod HaSharon, Israel
 Cascais, Portugal
 Thame, United Kingdom
 Kuşadası, Turkey
 Athis-Mons, France

Notable residents
 George Enescu
 Romanian Royal family

Gallery

References

 
Towns in Romania
Populated places in Prahova County
Prahova Valley
Ski areas and resorts in Romania
Localities in Muntenia